The Wales women's national ice hockey team represents Wales in international ice hockey competitions. Since 2002, the team has participated in two friendlies.

All-time record against other nations

18 May 2002: England 1 – Wales 4
1 February 2004: Northern Conference 0 – Wales 3
10 April 2004: Scotland 0 – Wales 7
25 June 2005: Wales 4 – Scotland 0

References

Women's national ice hockey teams in Europe
Ice hockey in Wales
Ice